Valerie O'Connor is an Irish television actress, theatre actress and singer. She is best known for playing Det. Insp. Nikki Grogan in soap-opera Red Rock and Miss Jervis in ROY.

Personal life
O'Connor lives in Dublin city centre, but occasionally lives at a house in Wicklow at the weekends. O'Connor is an ambassador for Cystic Fibrosis Ireland and for their 'One in 1,000 Campaign'.

O'Connor revealed in August that she was nine months pregnant, and announced that she gave birth to a baby girl on 15 September 2016.

Television and filmography

Theatre

References

21st-century Irish actresses
Irish film actresses
Irish television actresses
Living people
People from County Dublin
1980s births